Caladenia perangusta, commonly known as the Boyup Brook spider orchid, is a species of orchid endemic to the south-west of Western Australia. It is a rare spider orchid with a single hairy leaf and one or two cream-yellow or red flowers with narrow, drooping sepals and petals.

Description 
Caladenia perangusta is a terrestrial, perennial, deciduous, herb with an underground tuber and which sometimes forms small clumps. The flowers are red, creamy-yellow or pale yellow with red markings. The sepals and petals are linear to lance-shaped near their base then narrow to a brownish-red, thread-like glandular tip. Flowering occurs from August to early October.

Taxonomy and naming 
Caladenia perangusta was first described in 2015 by Andrew Phillip Brown and Garry Brockman from a specimen collected near Boyup Brook and the description was published in Nuytsia. The specific epithet (perangusta) is derived from the Latin prefix per meaning "very" or "exceedingly" and angustus meaning "narrow" or "slender" referring to the thin petals and sepals.

Distribution and habitat 
Boyup Brook spider orchid occurs between Frankland and Boyup Brook in the Jarrah Forest biogeographic region where it grows in wandoo woodland.

Conservation
Caladenia perangusta is classified as "Priority Two" by the Western Australian Government Department of Parks and Wildlife, meaning that it is poorly known and known from only one or a few locations.

References 

perangusta
Orchids of Western Australia
Endemic orchids of Australia
Plants described in 2015
Endemic flora of Western Australia